Eric Ruuth (24 October 1746 – 25 May 1820) was a Swedish nobleman and the owner of Marsvinsholm Castle. He served as the Governor-General of Swedish Pomerania from 1792 to 1796. With his coal mine he started the company that would eventually become Höganäs AB.

Biography
He was born on 24 October 1746 to Gustaf Ruuth of Finland (1697–1757) and Baroness Ebba Christina Siöbladh. She was the daughter of Baron Carl Georg Siöblad, Lord of Marsvinsholm and Countess Beata Elisabeth Stenbock.

From 1782 to 1786 he made extensive renovations at Marsvinsholm Castle.

In 1786 he invited a Swiss cheesemaker to Marsvinsholm Castle. A few years later, Swiss style cheese were being produced in Sweden. He served as the Governor-General of Swedish Pomerania from 1792 to 1796. He was made a Swedish count in 1792. He died on 25 May 1820.

See also
Hunnestad Monument

References

External links

1746 births
1820 deaths
Businesspeople from Stockholm
Swedish nobility
Governors-General of Sweden
Gustavian era people
19th-century Swedish businesspeople
18th-century Swedish businesspeople
Knights of the Order of Charles XIII
Members of the Royal Swedish Academy of Sciences